{{Speciesbox
|image = Collomia_diversifolia_2.jpg
|status = G4
|status_system = TNC
|status_ref = <ref name=natureserve>{{Cite web
  | publisher =NatureServe
  | title = ‘’Collomia diversifolia  | work = NatureServe Explorer
  | url = http://explorer.natureserve.org/servlet/NatureServe?searchName=Collomia+diversifolia
  | accessdate = 2018-09-23}}</ref>
|genus = Collomia
|species = diversifolia
|authority = Greene
}}Collomia diversifolia'' is a species of flowering plant in the phlox family known by the common name serpentine collomia. It is endemic to California, where it is a member of the serpentine soils flora in the North Coast Ranges from the northern San Francisco Bay Area to Shasta County. It is a small annual herb with many branches bearing dark lance-shaped leaves, the most basal ones having three small teeth. Leaves and stems are lightly to densely covered with glandular hairs. The inflorescence is a cluster of several flowers each about a centimeter wide. The star-shaped flower has pointed violet lobes with yellowish bases coming together at a purple throat.

References

External links
Jepson Manual Treatment
Photo gallery

Endemic flora of California
Plants described in 1887
diversifolia